Joan Eaton is a Canadian bridge player.

Bridge accomplishments

Wins

 North American Bridge Championships (4)
 Freeman Mixed Board-a-Match (2) 2012, 2014 
 Rockwell Mixed Pairs (1) 1998 
 [Canadian Women's Team Championships] (7)  1994, 2003, 2005, 2009, 2011, 2013, 2016 (www.cbf.org)
 Whitehead Women's Pairs (1) 2003

Runners-up

 North American Bridge Championships (1)
 Wagar Women's Knockout Teams (1) 2005

Notes

American contract bridge players
Living people
Year of birth missing (living people)